Yu Sung-yup (Korean: 유성엽, born 25 January 1960) is a South Korean politician who was the Member of the National Assembly for Jeongeup from 2008 (also for Gochang from 2016) to 2020. He was also the co-presidents of the Minsaeng Party, serving with Park Joo-hyun. He formerly served the mayor of Jeongeup from 2002 to 2006. As a former member of the Party for Democracy and Peace, he was the party's vice president from 2018 to 2019 and the parliamentary leader from May to August 2019.

Career 
Yu was the candidate for mayor of Jeongup from the Millennium Democratic Party (MDP) during the local election in 2002. He defeated the incumbent Kuk Seung-rock who faced harsh criticisms at the end of his term. He left the MDP and joined the Uri Party in October 2003. He ran for the party's primary of Governor of North Jeolla in the early 2006, but defeated by Kim Wan-joo.

He won as an independent candidate for Jeongeup during the parliamentary election in 2008 and won again in 2012. Later, he shortly entered to New Politics Alliance for Democracy, but left the party and joined People's Party. In 2016, he ran for the newly formed Jeongeup-Gochang constituency and defeated Ha Jeong-yeol of the Democratic Party.

In the early 2018, Yu left the People's Party and joined the newly formed Party for Democracy and Peace (PDP). He ran for the party's presidency during the leadership election in August 2018, but came behind to Chung Dong-young, a former presidential candidate in 2007 South Korean presidential election. Instead, he became one of the Vice Presidents, but quit the position when he was elected the party's parliamentary leader.

On 12 August 2019, Yu left the PDP along with the party's dissidents group named Alternative Political Alliance for Change and Hope (later the New Alternatives). On 24 February 2020, he was elected as the co-presidents of the newly formed Minsaeng Party, along with Park Joo-hyun.

On 30 December 2021, Yu was one of the 12 former MPs joined or returned to the ruling Democratic Party.

Ideology 
Yu is a conservative and economically liberal who criticises President Moon Jae-in. He opposes Moon's Keynesian economic policy while advocating tax reductions. He has also a sceptical view towards the minimum wages.

During the COVID-19 pandemic, Yu urged the government to ban Chinese citizens from entering to South Korea in order to protect locals.

Election results

General elections

Local elections

Mayor of Jeongeup

References

External links 
 Official Website
 Yu Sung-yup on Twitter
 Yu Sung-yup on Facebook

1960 births
Living people
Members of the National Assembly (South Korea)
Mayors of places in South Korea
21st-century South Korean politicians
People from Jeongeup
Seoul National University alumni
Uri Party politicians
People's Party (South Korea, 2016) politicians